In mathematics, the infimum (abbreviated inf; plural infima) of a subset  of a partially ordered set  is a greatest element in  that is less than or equal to each element of  if such an element exists.  Consequently, the term greatest lower bound (abbreviated as ) is also commonly used. The supremum (abbreviated sup; plural suprema) of a subset  of a partially ordered set  is the least element in  that is greater than or equal to each element of  if such an element exists. Consequently, the supremum is also referred to as the least upper bound (or ).

The infimum is in a precise sense dual to the concept of a supremum.  Infima and suprema of real numbers are common special cases that are important in analysis, and especially in Lebesgue integration.  However, the general definitions remain valid in the more abstract setting of order theory where arbitrary partially ordered sets are considered.

The concepts of infimum and supremum are close to minimum and maximum, but are more useful in analysis because they better characterize special sets which may have .  For instance, the set of positive real numbers  (not including ) does not have a minimum, because any given element of  could simply be divided in half resulting in a smaller number that is still in   There is, however, exactly one infimum of the positive real numbers relative to the real numbers:  which is smaller than all the positive real numbers and greater than any other real number which could be used as a lower bound. An infimum of a set is always and only defined relative to a superset of the set in question. For example, there is no infimum of the positive real numbers inside the positive real numbers (as their own superset), nor any infimum of the positive real numbers inside the complex numbers with positive real part.

Formal definition 

A  of a subset  of a partially ordered set  is an element  of  such that
  for all  

  for all  

Existence and uniqueness 

Infima and suprema do not necessarily exist. Existence of an infimum of a subset  of  can fail if  has no lower bound at all, or if the set of lower bounds does not contain a greatest element. However, if an infimum or supremum does exist, it is unique.

Consequently, partially ordered sets for which certain infima are known to exist become especially interesting. For instance, a lattice is a partially ordered set in which all  subsets have both a supremum and an infimum, and a complete lattice is a partially ordered set in which  subsets have both a supremum and an infimum. More information on the various classes of partially ordered sets that arise from such considerations are found in the article on completeness properties.

If the supremum of a subset  exists, it is unique. Likewise, if the infimum exists, it is unique.

Relation to maximum and minimum elements 

The infimum of a subset  of a partially ordered set  assuming it exists, does not necessarily belong to  If it does, it is a minimum or least element of  Similarly, if the supremum of  belongs to  it is a maximum or greatest element of 

For example, consider the set of negative real numbers (excluding zero).  This set has no greatest element, since for every element of the set, there is another, larger, element.  For instance, for any negative real number  there is another negative real number  which is greater. On the other hand, every real number greater than or equal to zero is certainly an upper bound on this set.  Hence,  is the least upper bound of the negative reals, so the supremum is 0. This set has a supremum but no greatest element.

However, the definition of maximal and minimal elements is more general. In particular, a set can have many maximal and minimal elements, whereas infima and suprema are unique.

Whereas maxima and minima must be members of the subset that is under consideration, the infimum and supremum of a subset need not be members of that subset themselves.

Minimal upper bounds 
Finally, a partially ordered set may have many minimal upper bounds without having a least upper bound. Minimal upper bounds are those upper bounds for which there is no strictly smaller element that also is an upper bound. This does not say that each minimal upper bound is smaller than all other upper bounds, it merely is not greater. The distinction between "minimal" and "least" is only possible when the given order is not a total one. In a totally ordered set, like the real numbers, the concepts are the same.

As an example, let  be the set of all finite subsets of natural numbers and consider the partially ordered set obtained by taking all sets from  together with the set of integers  and the set of positive real numbers  ordered by subset inclusion as above. Yet, neither is  smaller than  nor is the converse true: both sets are minimal upper bounds but none is a supremum.

Least-upper-bound property 

The  is an example of the aforementioned completeness properties which is typical for the set of real numbers. This property is sometimes called .

If an ordered set  has the property that every nonempty subset of  having an upper bound also has a least upper bound, then  is said to have the least-upper-bound property. As noted above, the set  of all real numbers has the least-upper-bound property.

An example of a set that  the least-upper-bound property is  the set of rational numbers. Another example is the hyperreals; there is no least upper bound of the set of positive infinitesimals.

There is a corresponding ; an ordered set possesses the greatest-lower-bound property if and only if it also possesses the least-upper-bound property; the least-upper-bound of the set of lower bounds of a set is the greatest-lower-bound, and the greatest-lower-bound of the set of upper bounds of a set is the least-upper-bound of the set.

The least-upper-bound property is an indicator of the suprema.

Infima and suprema of real numbers 

In analysis, infima and suprema of subsets  of the real numbers are particularly important.
The completeness of the real numbers implies (and is equivalent to) that any bounded nonempty subset  of the real numbers has an infimum and a supremum. If  is not bounded below, one often formally writes  If  is empty, one writes

Properties

If  is any set of real numbers then  if and only if  and otherwise  

If  are sets of real numbers then  (unless ) and 

Identifying infima and suprema

Relation to limits of sequences

If  is any non-empty set of real numbers then there always exists a non-decreasing sequence  in  such that  Similarly, there will exist a (possibly different) non-increasing sequence  in  such that  

Expressing the infimum and supremum as a limit of a such a sequence allows theorems from various branches of mathematics to be applied.
It implies that if  is a real number (where all  are in ) and if  is a continuous function whose domain contains  and  then 

which (for instance) guarantees that  is an adherent point of the set 
If in addition to what has been assumed, the continuous function  is also an increasing or non-decreasing function, then it is even possible to conclude that  
This may be applied, for instance, to conclude that whenever  is a real (or complex) valued function with domain  whose sup norm  is finite, then for every non-negative real number 

Arithmetic operations on sets

The following formulas depend on a notation that conveniently generalizes arithmetic operations on sets. 
Throughout,  are sets of real numbers. 

Sum of sets

 
consisting of all possible arithmetic sums of pairs of numbers, one from each set. The infimum and supremum of the Minkowski sum satisfies 
 
and 

Product of sets

Scalar product of a set

The product of a real number  and a set  of real numbers is the set

If  then 

while if  then 
 
Using  and the notation  it follows that

Multiplicative inverse of a set

For any set  that does not contain  let

If  is non-empty then 
 
where this equation also holds when  if the definition  is used. 
This equality may alternatively be written as 
 
Moreover,  if and only if  where if  then

Duality 

If one denotes by  the partially-ordered set  with the opposite order relation; that is, for all  declare: 

For subsets of the real numbers, another kind of duality holds:  where

Examples

Infima 

 The infimum of the set of numbers  is  The number  is a lower bound, but not the greatest lower bound, and hence not the infimum.
 More generally, if a set has a smallest element, then the smallest element is the infimum for the set.  In this case, it is also called the minimum of the set.
 
 
 
 
 If  is a decreasing sequence with limit  then

Suprema 
 The supremum of the set of numbers  is  The number  is an upper bound, but it is not the least upper bound, and hence is not the supremum.
 
 
 
 

In the last example, the supremum of a set of rationals is irrational, which means that the rationals are incomplete.

One basic property of the supremum is

for any functionals  and 

The supremum of a subset  of  where  denotes "divides", is the lowest common multiple of the elements of 

See also 

 
 
 
  (infimum limit)

Notes

References

External links 

 
 

Order theory